Saturday Night with Conway Twitty  is the second studio album by Conway Twitty, released in 1959.

Track listing

References

1959 albums
Conway Twitty albums
MGM Records albums